Heaven for Betsy is an American sitcom that aired live on CBS twice a week on Tuesday and Thursday for fifteen minutes from September 30, 1952 to December 23, 1952.

The series stars real-life husband and wife Jack Lemmon and Cynthia Stone. It was based on The Couple Next Door, a sketch that Lemmon and Stone performed regularly in the variety series The Frances Langford/Don Ameche Show.

Pepsodent sponsored the program.

Premise
The series revolves around newlyweds Pete Bell, an assistant buyer in the toy department of a suburban New York department store, and Betsy Bell, a secretary turned homemaker, who always had to get Pete out of jams.

Cast
 Jack Lemmon as Pete Bell
 Cynthia Stone as Betsy Bell
 Cliff Hall as Alonzo Willmot

Production
Jacin Productions packaged and produced Heaven for Betsy. Richard Linkroum was the director, and Russ Beggs was a writer. The program was sponsored by Lever Brothers products Pepsodent and Shadow Wave. It originated at WCBS.

References

External links
 

1952 American television series debuts
1952 American television series endings
1950s American sitcoms
American live television series
American television spin-offs
Black-and-white American television shows
CBS original programming
Department stores in fiction
English-language television shows
Television shows set in New York (state)